Turner Broadcasting System, Inc. was an American television and media conglomerate. Founded by Ted Turner and based in Atlanta, Georgia, it merged with Time Warner (later WarnerMedia) on October 10, 1996. As of April 2022, all of its assets are now owned by Warner Bros. Discovery (WBD). The headquarters of Turner's properties are largely located at the CNN Center in Downtown Atlanta, and the Turner Broadcasting campus off Techwood Drive in Midtown Atlanta, which also houses Turner Studios. Some of their operations are housed within WBD's corporate and global headquarters inside 30 Hudson Yards in Manhattan's West Side district, and at 230 Park Avenue South in Midtown Manhattan, both in New York City, respectively.

Turner is known for several pioneering innovations in U.S. multichannel television, including its satellite uplink of local Atlanta independent station WTCG channel 17 as TBS—one of the first national "superstations", and its establishment of CNN—the first 24-hour news channel. It later launched a sister cable network, TNT, the children's channel Cartoon Network, and the movie channel Turner Classic Movies (TCM). Turner South—a network devoted to regional sports and southern lifestyle programming—was launched by Turner in 1999, but was later sold to Fox Sports Networks in 2006 to form SportSouth. The same year, it acquired Liberty Media's stake in their joint venture Court TV.

On June 14, 2018, Time Warner, including Turner Broadcasting System, was acquired by telecom firm AT&T and re-branded WarnerMedia. After the purchase, "Turner" was phased out as a corporate brand, and on March 4, 2019, its properties were dispersed into either WarnerMedia Entertainment (TBS, TNT, and TruTV), WarnerMedia News & Sports (CNN, Turner Sports, and AT&T SportsNet), or brought directly under Warner Bros. (Cartoon Network, Adult Swim, and Turner Classic Movies). On August 10, 2020, the WarnerMedia Entertainment and Warner Bros. Entertainment assets were merged to form WarnerMedia Studios & Networks Group.

As of 2020, AT&T reported the financial results for WarnerMedia's ad-supported cable networks under the Turner business unit, while also using the term "the TNets" to refer to the group of TBS, TNT, and TruTV in press releases. On April 8, 2022, WarnerMedia merged with Discovery, Inc. to form Warner Bros. Discovery, and almost all of both companies' ad-supported cable networks were brought under the unit Warner Bros. Discovery U.S. Networks.

History

Early history 
Turner Broadcasting System traces its roots to a billboard company in Savannah, Georgia, purchased by Robert Edward Turner II in the late 1940s. Turner grew the business, which later became known as Turner Advertising Company. Robert Edward Turner's son, Ted Turner, inherited the company when the elder Turner died in 1963. After taking over the company, Ted Turner expanded the business into radio and television.

Turner Broadcasting System as a formal entity was incorporated in Georgia on May 12, 1965.

1970s 
In 1970, Ted Turner purchased WJRJ-Atlanta, Channel 17, a small, Ultra High Frequency (UHF) station, and renamed it WTCG, for parent company Turner Communications Group. During December 1976, WTCG originated the "superstation" concept, transmitting via satellite to cable systems.

On December 17, 1976, at 1:00 pm, WTCG Channel 17's signal was beamed via satellite to its four cable systems in Grand Island, Nebraska; Newport News, Virginia; Troy, Alabama; and Newton, Kansas. All four cable systems started receiving the 1948 Dana Andrews – Cesar Romero film Deep Waters already in progress. The movie had started 30 minutes earlier. WTCG went from being a little television station to a major TV network that every one of the 24,000 households outside of the 675,000 in Atlanta was receiving coast-to-coast. WTCG became a so-called Superstation and created a precedent of today's basic cable television.

HBO had gone to satellite transmissions to distribute its signal nationally in 1975, but that was a service that cable subscribers were made to pay extra to receive. Ted Turner's innovation signaled the start of the basic cable revolution.

In 1979, the company changed its name to Turner Broadcasting System, Inc. (TBS, Inc.) and the call letters of its main entertainment channel to WTBS.

1980s 
On June 1, 1980, Cable News Network (CNN) was launched at 5:00 p.m. EDT becoming the first 24-hour news cable channel. The husband and wife team of Dave Walker and Lois Hart news anchored the first newscast. Burt Reinhardt, then executive vice president of CNN, hired most of the channel's first 200 employees and 25-member staff including Bernard Shaw, the network's first news anchor.

In 1981, Turner Broadcasting System acquired Brut Productions from Faberge Inc.

Also in 1981, WTBS began its usage of "Turner Time" in June 1981, in which programming began at five minutes after the top and bottom of each hour, instead of the broadcasting norm of beginning at the top and bottom of the hour.

In 1984, Turner initiated Cable Music Channel, his competition for WASEC's MTV. The channel was short-lived, but helped influence the original format of VH1.

In 1986, after a failed attempt to acquire CBS, Turner purchased the film studio MGM/UA Entertainment Co. from Kirk Kerkorian for $1.5 billion. Following the acquisition, Turner had an enormous debt and sold parts of the acquisition. MGM/UA Entertainment was sold back to Kirk Kerkorian. The MGM/UA Studio lot in Culver City was sold to Lorimar-Telepictures. Turner kept MGM's pre-May 1986 film and TV library as well as the Associated Artists Productions library (the pre-1950 Warner Bros. film library and the Fleischer Studios/Famous Studios Popeye cartoons originally released by Paramount Pictures), and the U.S./Canadian distribution rights to the RKO Pictures library. Turner Entertainment Co. was founded on August 4, 1986.

Turner Program Services ("TPS"), a subsidiary under the Turner umbrella, began domestic syndication of all of the properties acquired under the final disposition of the MGM deal with Kerkorian. TPS inherited over 5,000 program orders (executed, letters of intent) to have domestic syndication agreements prepared and sent in order to "formally" contractually license films for airing on domestic, free-over-the-air television stations throughout the U.S. The contractual "back-log" was caught up by the end of 1989, while still administering to all of a domestic TV station's syndication needs. In 1987, top-rated television network NBC was considered bidding for a piece of the company in an effort to enter the cable business, but the deal was never materialized.

In 1989, TBS Management Company, under the leadership of Charles Shultz (Ted's first company controller at the original, small TV station), advanced the focus on the two music performing rights subsidiaries: one with Broadcast Music, Inc ("BMI") and ASCAP. In the space of 1989 to 1994, Turner went from 2 subsidiary music publishing companies to no less than sixteen.

On October 3, 1988, the company launched Turner Network Television (TNT).

1990s 
Turner expanded its presence in movie production and distribution, first with the 1991 purchase of the Hanna-Barbera animation studio during a competitive bid with MCA/Universal, Hallmark Cards, and several other corporations. On December 22, 1993, Turner acquired Castle Rock Entertainment. Turner purchased New Line Cinema a month later.

Turner launched Cartoon Network on October 1, 1992, followed by Turner Classic Movies (TCM) on April 14, 1994.

On October 10, 1996, Turner merged with Time Warner, a company formed in 1990 by the merger of Time Inc. and Warner Communications, and which had held 20% of Turner Broadcasting in the past. Through this merger, Warner Bros. had regained the rights to its pre-1950 library, while Turner gained access to the company's post-1950 library and other properties.

2000s 
In 2002, the Indian division of Turner started a joint venture with Zee Entertainment Enterprises known as Zee Turner for distribution.

In 2003, Philip I. Kent succeeded Jamie Kellner as chairman. Operational duties for The WB were transferred by Time Warner from Warner Bros. to Turner Broadcasting during 2001, while Kellner was chairman, but were returned to Warner Bros. in 2003 with the departure of Kellner.

On January 1, 2004, Turner launched Pogo TV in India as the sister channel to Cartoon Network India. The channel is exclusive to South Asia.

On February 23, 2006, the company agreed to sell the regional entertainment channel Turner South to Fox Entertainment Group. Fox assumed control of the channel on May 1, and on October 13 relaunched it as SportSouth – coincidentally, the former name of Fox Sports South when Turner owned this channel in partnership with Liberty Media between 1990 and 1996.

In May 2006, Time Warner, which had owned 50% of Court TV since 1998, purchased the remaining 50% from Liberty Media and began running the channel as part of Turner Broadcasting. The channel was relaunched as TruTV on January 1, 2008.

Also in May 2006, Ted Turner attended his last meeting as a board member of Time Warner and officially parted with the company.

On October 5, 2007, Turner Broadcasting System completed the acquisition of Claxson Interactive Pay Television Networks in Latin America.

On March 2, 2009, Turner launched Real, the company's first Hindi GEC, in India as a joint venture between it and Alva Brothers Entertainment, which it had partnered with before for content on Cartoon Network India and Pogo TV. The joint venture was known as Real Global Broadcasting. The channel was followed by WB India, which launched on March 15, 2009. The channel shut down in March of 2010 after lasting for a year due to low viewership.

On December 8, 2009, it was announced that Turner had bought a majority stake in NDTV Imagine Ltd. from NDTV, as the company's own channel, Real was struggling. NDTV Imagine Ltd. was previously a joint venture between NDTV and NBCUniversal. Turner then went on to acquire 100% of NDTV Imagine Ltd. which included NDTV Imagine, NDTV Lumiere, Imagine Showbiz and NDTV Imagine Pictures. Turner dropped the NDTV branding from the channels. Turner sold Imagine Showbiz to Reliance Broadcast Network in 2011.

2010s 
On August 26, 2010, Turner Broadcasting took full control of Chilevisión, a television channel owned by the President of Chile Sebastián Piñera.

On September 8, 2011, Turner Broadcasting System acquired LazyTown Entertainment, the producer of the TV series LazyTown.

On January 1, 2014, John K. Martin succeeded Phil Kent as chairman and CEO of Turner Broadcasting.

In August 2014, The Wrap reported that Turner was preparing to offer buy-outs to 550 employees as part of plans to restructure the company heading into 2015. The ratings performance of CNN and HLN were cited as a factor, while CBSSports.com reported that the rising rights fees Turner pays for its NBA broadcasts on TNT may have also been a factor. It was further reported in October 2014 that the company planned to reduce its workforce by 10% (1,475 people) through layoffs across a wide set of units including corporate positions.

On August 14, 2015, it was announced that Turner Broadcasting had acquired a majority stake in iStreamPlanet, a Las Vegas-based video streaming services company, in an effort to bolster its over-the-top programming and shift its core technology infrastructure to the cloud. iStreamPlanet is a direct competitor of Major League Baseball Advanced Media. The deal was reported to be in the neighborhood of $200 million. In October 2015, Turner launched a streaming-video network named Great Big Story.

In April 2017, in order to expedite the sale of Time Warner to AT&T by shedding FCC-licensed properties, WPCH-TV was sold to Meredith Corporation, which had already been operating WPCH under a local marketing agreement since 2011 as a sister to its local CBS affiliate WGCL-TV. Turner Podcast Network was formed within Turner's content distribution division in June 2017, with Tyler Moody being named general manager and vice president of the unit.

On March 22, 2018, Six Flags and Riverside Group announced a partnership with Turner Asia Pacific to bring attractions based on Tuzki and other Turner-owned IPs to its theme parks in China.

On June 15, 2018, it was announced that John Martin would be leaving as CEO following AT&T's completed acquisition of Time Warner. By September, AT&T had transferred its Audience channel, a group of regional sports networks plus stakes in Game Show Network and MLB Network to Turner from AT&T Communications.

In December 2018, Turner Broadcasting sold the rights to the brand and its pre-2008 original programming library of defunct cable network Court TV (which relaunched as truTV in 2008) to Katz Broadcasting, with plans to re-launch it as an over-the-air digital network in May 2019.

On March 4, 2019, AT&T announced a major reorganization of its broadcasting assets to effectively dissolve Turner Broadcasting System. Its assets are to be dispersed across multiple units of WarnerMedia, including the newly created WarnerMedia Entertainment and WarnerMedia News & Sports. WarnerMedia Entertainment would consist of HBO, TBS, TNT, TruTV, and an upcoming direct-to-consumer video service (led by former NBC entertainment chief Robert Greenblatt), while WarnerMedia News & Sports would consist of CNN, Turner Sports, and the AT&T SportsNet regional networks (which would be led by CNN Worldwide president Jeff Zucker). Cartoon Network, Adult Swim, Boomerang, and Turner Classic Movies would be moved under Warner Bros. Entertainment via the new "Global Kids & Young Adults" business unit. Although AT&T did not specify any timetable for the changes, WarnerMedia had already begun to remove references to Turner Broadcasting in corporate communications, with press releases referring to its networks as being "divisions of WarnerMedia".

2020s
On August 10, 2020, WarnerMedia restructured several of its units in a major corporate revamp that resulted in TBS, TNT and TruTV being brought back under the same umbrella as Cartoon Network/Adult Swim, Boomerang and TCM, under a consolidation of WarnerMedia Entertainment and Warner Bros. Entertainment's respective assets that formed the combined WarnerMedia Studios & Networks Group unit. Casey Bloys—who has been with WarnerMedia since 2004 (as director of development at HBO Independent Productions), and was eventually elevated to President of Programming at HBO and Cinemax in May 2016—added oversight of WarnerMedia's basic cable networks and HBO Max to his purview.

On April 8, 2022, WarnerMedia was divested by AT&T and merged with Discovery, Inc. to form Warner Bros. Discovery (WBD). All linear networks owned by the company, besides CNN, Turner Sports, HBO, and Magnolia Network, are overseen by Kathleen Finch as head of Warner Bros. Discovery Networks U.S., which resulted in Brett Weitz being removed as general manager of TBS, TNT, and TruTV after 14 years with the networks. The News and Sports division was also split up into separate CNN Global and Warner Bros. Discovery Sports divisions, with the latter also including Discovery's sports properties such as Eurosport.

Assets 
 TBS
 TNT
 TruTV

Former properties and assets

Transferred to Warner Bros. 
 Castle Rock Entertainment — A film production company
 Hanna-Barbera Cartoons — An animation studio (Folded into Warner Bros. Animation in 2001)
 New Line Cinema — A film production company
 Turner Entertainment Co. — A film holding company
 Turner Pictures — A defunct in-house production company
 Turner Pictures Worldwide Distribution — An international distribution sales unit
 Turner Feature Animation — A defunct animation unit
 Turner Home Entertainment — A defunct home video distributor (Merged into Warner Home Video)
 Turner Program Services — A former syndication arm − (Merged into Warner Bros' Telepictures Productions)
 The WB — A defunct broadcast television network (with Tribune Broadcasting, 2001–2003; merged with UPN to form The CW in 2006)
 Transferred to Warner Bros. Interactive Entertainment
 Adult Swim Games
 Cartoon Network Games
 Transferred to Warner Bros. Television Studios
 Cartoon Network Studios
 Cartoon Network Productions (In conjunction with The Cartoon Network, Inc.)
 Williams Street
 Williams Street Records
 Williams Street West
 Transferred to Warner Bros. Television Studios UK
 Hanna-Barbera Studios Europe

Transferred to Warner Bros. Discovery Networks 
Note: These assets were temporarily part of Turner Entertainment Networks & Warner Bros. under WarnerMedia Studios & Networks within the WarnerMedia era.

An (*) indicates the assets was once part of Warner Bros. Global Kids, Young Adults and Classics.

The Cartoon Network, Inc.
 Cartoon Network*
 Adult Swim*
 Boomerang*

Entertainment Group 
 TBS
 TNT
 TruTV
 Turner Classic Movies*
 Now Playing (magazine)

Shuttered
 Cable Music Channel — A defunct television channel
 CNN+, a joint-venture between Turner (50%) and Sogecable that is only aired in Spain, closed down in late 2010.
 CNNfn — A defunct television channel
 CNN/SI — A defunct television channel
 FilmStruck — A defunct film streaming service
 HBO South Asia
 Mondo Mah-jong TV (Japan)
 Studio T — a defunct production company.
 Super Deluxe — An defunct entertainment company
 Tabi Tele (Japan)
 TCM South East Asia
 Toonami Channel (Asia)
 Toonami India
 WB India
 Real (TV channel) (India)
 Imagine TV (India)

Divested
 Atlanta Hawks, Atlanta Thrashers and Philips Arena – sold in 2004 to Atlanta Spirit Group, Thrashers resold in 2011 to True North Sports and Entertainment and now known as the Winnipeg Jets. Hawks resold in 2015 to Tony Ressler
 Chilevisión — A Chilean Free-to-air television channel, sold to Paramount Global
 Game Show Network (42%)
 GameTap — sold to Metaboli in 2008, later closed in 2010
 Hulu (10%)
 Showtime Scandinavia through NonStop Television in the Scandinavian countries.
 Silver, independent and international movies, through NonStop Television in the Scandinavian countries.
 SportSouth — A regional sports network (Now owned by Diamond Sports Group as Bally Sports South)
 Turner South — A regional television channel (Now owned by Diamond Sports Group as Bally Sports Southeast)
 Woohoo (Brazil)
 Universal Wrestling Corporation — A professional wrestling promotion formerly known as World Championship Wrestling. Currently a non-operational company, select assets are now owned by WWE through WCW, Inc.
 WCNC-TV — A terrestrial broadcasting station in Charlotte (now owned by Tegna Inc.)
 WPCH-TV — A terrestrial broadcasting station in Atlanta and a former superstation (now owned by Gray Television)

References

External links 
 Turner Broadcasting System (Archive)
 

 
American companies established in 1965
Conglomerate companies established in 1965
Cable network groups in the United States
Broadcasting companies of the United States
Entertainment companies of the United States
Mass media companies of the United States
Multinational companies headquartered in the United States
Companies based in Atlanta
Mass media companies established in 1965
1965 establishments in Georgia (U.S. state)
Former Time Warner subsidiaries
1996 mergers and acquisitions
Television broadcasting companies of India
Mass media companies of India
American companies disestablished in 2019
Entertainment companies disestablished in 2019
Mass media companies disestablished in 2019
2019 disestablishments in Georgia (U.S. state)
Predecessors of Warner Bros. Discovery